Joseph Paul Seiders (born September 5, 1980) is an American touring/session multi-instrumentalist and is the drummer and backing vocalist for The New Pornographers.

Primarily a drummer, Joe also sings, plays keyboards, accordion, and guitar. Seiders was born in Winchester, Massachusetts and grew up in Derry, New Hampshire. Having a father that also played drums, he developed an interest for the drum kit at a very young age. He was also classically trained on piano from the age of five.

He has toured, recorded, and worked with a variety of artists, including The New Pornographers, Neko Case, Emitt Rhodes, John Oates, Tracy Bonham, Juliana Hatfield, Chris Mann, Gary Jules, Bleu, Josh Kaufman, Pat Badger, Night Terrors of 1927, Val McCallum, among many others.

Seiders' percussion, accordion, and vocal talents were also featured in the 2015 Disney film, Tinker Bell and the Legend of the NeverBeast.

Joe is also known as an avid mixologist.

References

1980 births
Living people
People from Winchester, Massachusetts
Musicians from Massachusetts
Musicians from New Hampshire
The New Pornographers members
American rock drummers